Aloe castanea (Cat's tail Aloe) is a species of aloe endemic to South Africa.

References
 Rec. Albany Mus. 2: 138 1907.
 The Plant List
 JSTOR
 Encyclopedia of Life
 CalFlora

castanea